The Grand Bargain: Agenda for Humanity, usually called the Grand Bargain, is an agreement to reform the delivery of humanitarian aid, that was struck at the World Humanitarian Summit in May 2016. The agreement contains 51 specific commitments, grouped into ten focus areas, with activity targets to be completed by January 1, 2020.

Parties to the agreement are national governments and humanitarian aid agencies, 30 of which initially signed up, rising to 48 within the first year; the 48 signatories controlled 95% of global humanitarian aid spending at the time.

By 2020, only partial progress had occurred, prompting criticism from some humanitarian practitioners and reflection from others that the original ambitions has an unrealistic time frame.

Negotiations for a second set of agreements, the Grand Bargain 2.0, started in 2021.

Background 

As part of his 2012 goal to improve the humanitarian system, United Nations Secretary-General Ban Ki-moon convened the 2016 World Humanitarian Summit in Istanbul with the goal of knowledge sharing and creating best practices. Ki-moon created the High-Level Panel on Humanitarian Financing, appointing Kristalina Georgieva and Nazrin Shah of Perak, as co-chairs.

The High-Level Panel on Humanitarian Financing produced the report Too important to fail - addressing the humanitarian financing gap which was presented at the World Humanitarian Summit in May 2016. The report highlighted a US$15 billion shortfall between the cost of addressing humanitarian needs and the global budget to respond. It called for new ways to fund growing humanitarian needs, such as taxation for luxury goods and services. The group's report called for a Grand Bargain between nations to address the unmet humanitarian needs.

Agreement

Negotiations 
Governments reached an agreement, called the Grand Bargain, after a “messy”, “disjointed”, and “incredibly bureaucratic” process. In particular, donor governments disliked the administrative consequences of diverting aid spending away from United Nations agencies. As such, the negotiations were heated and compared to what was suggested in the report, the final commitments were diluted, for example the degree of enthusiasm to disburse cash in humanitarian relief, due to the United States' Government's preference to give tangible aid items.

Focus areas 
Parties to the agreement committed transparently and harmoniously sharing high-quality data on humanitarian funding within two years. The agreement indicated that the International Aid Transparency Initiative data model was likely the best mechanism to record the data. They also commitment to increase spending on local organisations from 0.4% of the overall budget to 25% by 2020. In subsequent years, this effort became known as Localisation. On cash and voucher assistance, conflicting statements were made simultaneously mentioning the benefits of giving people with humanitarian needs cash, but without setting any specific targets, and also calling for more research into benefits and risks. Parties agreed to reduce duplication and management costs; to harmonise the templates for grant agreements between government donors and humanitarian agencies. There was agreement for unification of assessments of unmet humanitarian needs, although that element was criticised by ACAPS for not addressing the necessary changes they called for. A commitment was made to better include the perspectives of the people in communities affected by humanitarian crisis. Parties committed to multi-year funding; to provide aid agencies with agreements to fund their activities for multiple years at a time, rather than requiring annual requests for funding. Parties committed to put more funding into emergency funds, such as the Central Emergency Relief Fund, in order to increase flexibility of how funds can be used in emergencies. Government donors agreed to harmonise the reporting requirements they put on humanitarian agencies by 2018, and reduce the reporting volume.There was agreement to improve collaboration and coordination between groups working on prevention of humanitarian crisis, those working on mitigating the effects of crisis and those responding to emergencies. In total, the Grand Bargain included 51 specific commitments each grouped under the aforementioned themes.

Commitments 
The Grand Bargain contains commitments that apply to aid agencies, donors, or both. In total 51 commitments apply to donors:

In addition to improving the humanitarian system, the commitments were expected to save US$1 billion per year.

Each of the ten focus areas has two co-conveners, a government donor and a humanitarian aid agency who report into a facilitation group that coordinates the work between the ten focus areas. The administration of the process is done by the Directorate-General for European Civil Protection and Humanitarian Aid Operations.

Signatories 

30 governments and aid agencies signed up to the Grand Bargain initially, expanding to 48 by March 2017. At the time, the 48 signatories controlled 95% of global spending on humanitarian aid. By December 2021, 64 organizations had signed up. Government signatories included USA, UK, Germany, France, and Japan; aid agency signatories included the International Federation of Red Cross and Red Crescent Societies.

Aid agency, Medecins Sans Frontieres, did not sign the agreement, criticizing the process for its non-binding commitments, a decision itself that was criticized as "cynical" by Nancy Lindborg of the United States Institute of Peace.

Critical reception in 2016  

In 2016, the Grand Bargain was met with a mixture of enthusiasm, pragmatic caution, and dismay. Lilianne Ploumen pointed out how difficult it is to get multiple governments to all agree to big changes. The Overseas Development Institute criticized the Grand Bargain for its similarity with the status quo, pointing out a need for more specific targets and timelines. Colin Bruce of the World Bank said that the agreement was owned by no-one and stressed the importance of following up on the commitments. Peter Maurer of the International Committee of the Red Cross praised the focus on reducing reporting to donor governments.

Andras Derzsi-Horvath and Julia Steets of the Global Public Policy Institute published an op-ed in DW News criticizing the Grand Bargain for having only voluntary obligations.

Progress towards commitments and critique in the 2020s 
In 2021, The New Humanitarian reported that many of the 51 commitments had only been partly met. Wendy Fenton of the Humanitarian Practice Network and Overseas Development Institute said that the 51 commitments were too much to have attempted in five years.

A June 2021 independent review of the Grand Bargain by the Overseas Development Institute praised the progress towards policy shifts around provision of cash assistance, increasing funding to local aid groups, harmonised needs assessments and reporting. It was noted that the policy had a lower impact on actual practice. The Overseas Development Institute review criticised the way the transparency commitments were written, noted the lack of global agreement on how to distribute cash to people in need, and lamented the poor progress towards cost savings. The review reported a lack of political interest in including the perspectives of the people living in humanitarian crises in designing emergency responses.

UK-based group Development Initiatives reported in 2021 that the percentage of funding going to local organisations between 2016 and 2020 actually reduced from 3.5% to 2.1%. Degan Ali, of Adeso writing in OpenDemocracy in 2020, described the Grand Bargain as a "failed effort".

Grand Bargain 2.0 

In 2021, 60 donors started new negotiations to create an updated Grand Bargain 2.0 that will cover 2020 to 2023. Grand Bargain 2.0 focuses on greater support to local humanitarian agencies, improved participation of people from communities affected by humanitarian crisis and more flexible funding to aid agencies. The June 2021 meeting to agree details was led by Jan Egeland, of the Norwegian Refugee Council.

The Grand Bargain 2.0 agreement attempts to address concerns raised about the original agreement with a focus on an improved consultation process with local organizations.

See also 

 UN Office for the Coordination of Humanitarian Affairs
Network for Empowered Aid Response

References

Further reading 
 Global Humanitarian Overview 2021, United Nations Office for the Coordination of Humanitarian Affairs
 The State of the Humanitarian System, ALNAP

External links 

 The Grand Bargain Agreement
 Grand Bargain 
 Too important to fail—addressing the humanitarian financing gap, 2016, High-Level Panel on Humanitarian Financing

United Nations
Humanitarian aid
Globalization
International development multilaterals
International development
Foreign policy
Global politics
2016 in Turkey
Human rights instruments